The Best of Nelly Furtado is a greatest hits album by Canadian singer-songwriter Nelly Furtado. The album was first released on 12 November 2010. The album includes all of Furtado's biggest hits, as well as songs she is featured in and three new songs: "Night Is Young", "Stars" and "Girlfriend in the City". It was released in standard, deluxe and super deluxe editions. The album's track listing and artwork were revealed on 14 October 2010.

Content
Talking about how she picked the new songs to be on the greatest hits Furtado said, "The way I picked the new songs for Best of Nelly Furtado was I was just coming off my Latin American tour for Mi Plan and two of my songs got leaked on the internet. Somebody in Eastern Europe or something leaked the songs on the internet. One song was "Night Is Young" and the other song was "Girlfriend In The City", but they were kind of horrible versions that weren’t even finished and not mixed. So I thought okay, a lot of my fans have heard these new songs anyway in their rough version, I might as well finish them and put them out properly on the greatest hits album. It kind of seemed like the natural choice. And then the third selection is "Stars", which is a song Lester Mendez and I wrote a couple years ago when we were doing the Loose sessions. It’s one of those songs that I think people who like Folklore will like, because it’s more intimate and slow." The diss track "Give It to Me" was omitted from the album's track listing due to the negative lyrical content according to Furtado in an interview.

Critical reception

Stephen Thomas Erlewine of AllMusic gave the album a four out of five star rating, noting the variety on the album and commended that "Not one of Nelly Furtado’s albums sounds like the one that came before", calling it an "admirable trait". Slant Magazine called Furtado "one of pop music's most eclectic artists" and wrote that "the set also positions Furtado as one of the absolute finest singles artists of her generation."

Scott Kara from The New Zealand Herald saw the release as being for the fans.

Promotion
On 26 August 2010 at the "Orange Warsaw Festival" in Poland, Furtado debuted two previously unreleased songs, "Night Is Young" and "Girlfriend in the City".

Commercial performance
The album charted only in European territories for solely one week, while lasting two in Switzerland, debuting at 100 and peaking at 29. The album is certified gold in Poland and in the UK.

Track listing

Notes
 signifies a vocal producer
 signifies a co-producer
 signifies an additional producer

Personnel
Credits for unreleased songs are taken from The Best of Nelly Furtado liner notes.

"Girlfriend in the City"
Nelly Furtado - lead vocals
Salaam Remi - bass, guitar, drums, arrangement
Vincent Henry - horns
Mark "Spike" Stent - mixing
Frank Socorro  - recording
Gleyder "GEE" Disla - recording
The Czech Film Orchestra - strings
Stephen Coleman - strings arrangement

"Night Is Young"
Nelly Furtado - lead vocals
Salaam Remi - drums 
StayBent Krunk-a-Delic - drums
Robert Orton - mixing
Frank Socorro  - recording
Gleyder "GEE" Disla - recording

"Stars"
Nelly Furtado - lead vocals
Ramon Stagnaro - acoustic guitar
 Joe Wohlmuth - engineering, mixing
 Joel Numa - additional engineering
 Lester Mendez - mixing

Charts

Certifications

Release history

References

2010 greatest hits albums
Nelly Furtado albums
Geffen Records albums